Javardeh or Javar Deh may refer to:
 Javardeh, Gilan (جوارده - Javārdeh)
 Javardeh, Kohgiluyeh and Boyer-Ahmad (جاورده - Jāvardeh)